Longwick is a village  northwest of Princes Risborough, Buckinghamshire, England, on the A4129 road.

The toponym is from the Old English for "long farm".

With Ilmer, Owlswick, Meadle and Horsenden, it forms the civil parish of Longwick-cum-Ilmer which was created in 1934. In 1951 its population was 786, since when it has increased significantly to 1,267 in 2001.

Longwick was the location for the Sunrise/Back to the Future Acid House party on 12 August 1989.

Transport
Longwick is served on a daily basis by the Risborough Area Community Bus (RCB) with hourly services to Princes Risborough, five times a day. Longwick is also served by Redline Buses' 320 rail link service between Princes Risborough and Chinnor at peak times.

References

External links
For a map see the Wycombe District site describing the Parish of Longwick-cum-Ilmer

Hamlets in Buckinghamshire